Nina Agatha Rosamond Barrer (9 August 1879 – 17 September 1965) was a New Zealand teacher and community leader. She was born in Picton, Marlborough, New Zealand, on 9 August 1879.

References

1879 births
1965 deaths
New Zealand educators
People from Picton, New Zealand